The 2004 NCAA Division I-A football season was the highest level of college football competition in the United States organized by the National Collegiate Athletic Association (NCAA). The regular season began on August 28, 2004 and ended on December 4, 2004. The postseason concluded on January 4, 2005 with the Orange Bowl, which served as the season's BCS National Championship Game.

USC defeated Oklahoma in the Orange Bowl by a score of 55–19, which earned the Trojans their second consecutive AP title and first-ever BCS title. The Orange Bowl win and accompanying BCS title were later vacated as part of the sanctions levied against USC following an NCAA investigation. USC appealed the decision but was denied by the NCAA, and the 2004 BCS title was officially vacated on June 6, 2011.

Rule changes
The NCAA Rules Committee adopted the following rule changes for the 2004 season:
 Instant replay would make its debut in college football, as the Big Ten Conference began to use it on a one-year experimental basis.
 Officials are allowed to announce the number of a player committing a penalty, similar to the NFL.
 Modifying the rule regarding offensive substitutions made and rushing to snap the ball before the defense can make their changes; eliminating the five yard penalty for the first offense (but stopping play and warning the offensive team), but maintaining the 15 yard unsportsmanlike conduct penalty for further violations.
 Allowing the head coach to request a time-out.
 Allowing the receiving team the option to enforce encroachment penalties on punts/kickoffs either from the end of the return or from the previous line of scrimmage, requiring a re-kick.
 Leaping on PAT/Field Goal attempts is prohibited.
 Defensive pass interference will not be called when a kicker throws a ball high and downfield to simulate a pass.
 Roughing the passer will not be called if a defensive player is blocked into the passer.

Conference changes

Prior to the 2004 season, Miami (FL) and Virginia Tech left the Big East Conference to join the Atlantic Coast Conference (ACC), giving the ACC 11 members. Connecticut joined the Big East after having been an Independent since ascending to Division I-A in 2000. Troy State also left their Independent status and joined the Sun Belt Conference. Florida Atlantic University and Florida International University moved up from Division I-AA and became I-A Independents. Florida A&M also briefly attempted to move up to Division I-A and become the only HBCU at college football's highest level, but the team was forced to abort its bid.

Regular season top 10 matchups
Rankings reflect the AP Poll. Rankings for Week 8 and beyond will list BCS Rankings first and AP Poll second. Teams that failed to be a top 10 team for one poll or the other will be noted.
Week 2
No. 5 Miami defeated No. 4 Florida State, 16–10 OT (Miami Orange Bowl, Miami, Florida)
Week 5
No. 8 Auburn defeated No. 10 Tennessee, 34–10 (Neyland Stadium, Knoxville, Tennessee)
Week 6
No. 1 USC defeated No. 7 California, 23–17 (Los Angeles Memorial Coliseum, Los Angeles, California)
No. 2 Oklahoma defeated No. 5 Texas, 12–0 (Cotton Bowl, Dallas, Texas)
Week 7
No. 7 Florida State defeated No. 6 Virginia, 36–3 (Doak Campbell Stadium, Tallahassee, Florida)
No. 10 Wisconsin defeated No. 5 Purdue, 20–17 (Ross-Ade Stadium, West Lafayette, Indiana)
Week 11
No. 3/3 Auburn defeated No. 8/8 Georgia, 24–6 (Jordan-Hare Stadium, Auburn, Alabama)
Week 14
No. 12/10 Virginia Tech defeated No. 10/9 Miami, 16–10 (Miami Orange Bowl, Miami, Florida)

BCS Controversy

Undefeated teams 
The 2004 season ended with five undefeated teams vying for a spot in the national title game. In the 2003 season, no team finished the regular season unbeaten, and five teams finished the season with one loss. In 2004, the situation became even more complicated, as five teams went without losing, a record in the BCS era (later tied in 2009). USC of the Pac-10, Oklahoma of the Big 12, Auburn of the SEC, Utah of the MWC, and Boise State of the WAC all finished the regular season undefeated. USC and Oklahoma were ranked No. 1 and No. 2, respectively, in the preseason by both the AP and Coaches Polls, but the other three undefeated teams were handicapped by starting the season out of the top 15. Thus USC and OU played for the BCS National Championship in the Orange Bowl, while Auburn, Utah, and Boise State had to settle for other bowl games.

Utah became the first BCS Buster and beat Pittsburgh, the champion of the Big East and ranked No. 21, in the Fiesta Bowl. Boise State lost a close, high scoring game in the Liberty Bowl to Louisville, the No. 10 ranked Conference USA champion.

As with previous seasons, fans of successful teams left out of BCS bowls were disappointed. Auburn, Utah, and Boise State all went unbeaten but were not offered a chance to compete for the BCS championship. Auburn was especially the focus of national media attention on this topic, since Auburn managed to go undefeated in the traditionally tough SEC. Adding to the frustration with the BCS system was the fact that Auburn and Utah, though both picked to play in BCS bowl games, would not be able to play each other as a match-up of highly ranked unbeatens. This confluence of events made 2004 a seminal year for serious momentum building behind a multi-team playoff system in college football, which would later be realized with the advent of the College Football Playoff.

USC was forced to vacate its BCS title win, along with its regular-season victory over rival UCLA, due to NCAA sanctions that stemmed from the USC athletics scandal. The AP title was not vacated, as the AP does not punish teams for violations. The severity of these sanctions has since been criticized by some pundits across college football.

Rose Bowl 
Controversy also arose in selecting the second at-large team of the BCS after Utah. California expected to get the invitation, having been ranked fourth by the BCS entering the last week of the regular season. Texas, which had been left out of the BCS the previous season, was ranked fifth. Both teams finished with 10–1 records, but the Longhorns received a boost of support from poll voters in the final regular season rankings to overtake Cal and move into the fourth position, which ensured they would also receive the final at-large bid. Texas coach Mack Brown was criticized for publicly politicking voters to put Texas ahead of California, and Cal coach Jeff Tedford called for coaches' votes to be made public. Texas went on to defeat Michigan in the Rose Bowl, while California lost to Texas Tech in the Holiday Bowl. Much of the pre-bowl criticisms of Texas being given the spot vs. Michigan evaporated when the Longhorns and Wolverines produced an instant classic game that was marked by a breakthrough performance by Vince Young and a Texas FG as time expired to give them a 38–37 victory.

AP Poll 
The Associated Press, as a result of two consecutive seasons of BCS controversy, prohibited the BCS from using their poll as part of its ranking formula following the 2004 season. The AP poll was replaced by the Harris Interactive poll starting in 2005, and the AP continues to award its own national championship trophy.

In another first, the LSU Tigers lost to the Iowa Hawkeyes on a last second Hail Mary pass in the Capital One Bowl, becoming the first school to lose a non-BCS bowl a year after winning the BCS National Championship Game.

Conference standings

Final AP Poll

 USC (11–0)* 
 Auburn (13–0)
 Oklahoma (12–1)
 Utah (12–0)
 Texas (11–1)
 Louisville (11–1)
 Georgia (10–2)
 Iowa (10–2)
 California (10–2)
 Virginia Tech (10–3)
 Miami (9–3)
 Boise State (11–1)
 Tennessee (10–3)
 Michigan (9–3)
 Florida State (9–3)
 LSU (9–3)
 Wisconsin (9–3)
 Texas Tech (8–4)
 Arizona State (9–3)
 Ohio State (8–4)
 Boston College (9–3)
 Fresno State (9–3)
 Virginia (8–4)
 Navy (10–2)
 Pittsburgh (8–4)
* USC finished the season with a 13–0 record but was forced to vacate two wins in 2010 as a result of NCAA sanctions.

Bowl games

BCS bowls
Rankings given are AP rankings going into bowl games
Orange Bowl: No. 1 (BCS No. 1) USC 55, No. 2 (BCS No. 2) Oklahoma 19 (vacated due to NCAA violations)
Rose Bowl: (At Large) No. 6 Texas 38, (Big Ten Champ) No. 13 Michigan 37
Fiesta Bowl: (At Large, MWC Champ) No. 5 Utah 35, (Big East Co-Champ) No. 19 Pittsburgh 7
Sugar Bowl: (SEC Champ) No. 3 Auburn 16, (ACC Champ) No. 9 Virginia Tech 13

Other New Years Day bowls
: No. 15 Tennessee 38, No. 22 Texas A&M 7
Capital One Bowl: No. 11 Iowa 30, No. 12 LSU 25
: No. 17 Florida State 30, West Virginia 18
Outback Bowl: No. 8 Georgia 24, No. 16 Wisconsin 21

December bowl games

Peach Bowl: No. 14 Miami (FL) 27, No. 20 Florida 10
Houston Bowl: Colorado 33, UTEP 28
Liberty Bowl: (C-USA Champ) No. 7 Louisville 44, (WAC Champ) No. 10 Boise State 40
: Fresno State 37, No. 18 Virginia 34 (OT)
Continental Tire Bowl: No. 25 Boston College 37, North Carolina 24
: Iowa State 17, Miami (Ohio) 13
: Northern Illinois 34, Troy State 21
Sun Bowl: No. 21 Arizona State 27, Purdue 23
Music City Bowl: Minnesota 20, Alabama 16
Holiday Bowl: No. 23 Texas Tech 45, No. 4 California 31
: Navy 34, New Mexico 19
Alamo Bowl: No. 24 Ohio State 33, Oklahoma State 7
Insight Bowl: Oregon State 38, Notre Dame 21
Champs Sports Bowl: Georgia Tech 51, Syracuse 14
Motor City Bowl: UConn 39, (MAC Champ) Toledo 10
Hawaii Bowl: Hawaii 59, UAB 40
Fort Worth Bowl: Cincinnati 32, Marshall 14
Las Vegas Bowl: Wyoming 24, UCLA 21
GMAC Bowl: Bowling Green 52, Memphis 35
New Orleans Bowl: Southern Miss 31, (SBC Champ) North Texas 10

Heisman Trophy voting
The Heisman Trophy is given annually to college football's most outstanding player

Winner: Matt Leinart (Jr.) USC, QB (1,325 pts.)
2. Adrian Peterson (Fr.) Oklahoma, RB (997 pts.)
3. Jason White (Sr.) Oklahoma, QB (957 pts.)
4. Alex Smith (Jr.) Utah, QB (635 pts.)
5. Reggie Bush (So.) USC, TB (597 pts.)

Other major awards
Walter Camp Award (top player): Matt Leinart, USC
Maxwell Award (top player): Jason White, Oklahoma
AP Player of the Year: Matt Leinart, USC
Lombardi Award (top linebacker): David Pollack, Georgia
John Mackey Award (tight end): Heath Miller, Virginia
Doak Walker Award (running back): Cedric Benson, Texas
Chuck Bednarik Award (defensive player): David Pollack, Georgia
Outland Trophy (interior lineman): Jammal Brown, Oklahoma
Davey O'Brien Award (quarterback): Jason White, Oklahoma
Johnny Unitas Award (Sr. quarterback): Jason White, Oklahoma
Fred Biletnikoff Award (wide receiver): Braylon Edwards, Michigan
Jim Thorpe Award (defensive back): Carlos Rogers, Auburn
Lou Groza Award (placekicker): Mike Nugent, Ohio State
Ray Guy Award (punter): Daniel Sepulveda, Baylor
Paul "Bear" Bryant Award (Coach of the Year): Tommy Tuberville, Auburn
The Home Depot Coach of the Year Award: Urban Meyer, Utah
Bobby Dodd Coach of the Year Award: Paul Johnson, Navy

See also
BCS controversies#2004–05 season

References